Louie Lopez (born November 26, 1994) is a regular-footed American skateboarder from Los Angeles, CA. He is of Mexican and Guatemalan descent.

Skateboarding career 
Lopez first became sponsored by Flip Skateboards at the age of seven. In 2006, Lopez made his video debut in Flip’s Feast Tours. In 2007, Lopez competed in the Tampa Am for the first time. Louie’s combination of technical ledge skills and ability to boost huge in transition made him an immediate threat on the contest circuit. Lopez put down solid performances in the Damn Am series on a board that looked bigger than he did, but showed the world his skating talent was even larger. Since turning pro for Flip in 2013, Louie has been a regular on the Dew Tour, standing on the podium five times and taking second in both Street and Street Style at the Chicago stops in 2015, followed second in Street at the LA stop. His home in Hawthorne, California has a backyard bowl, something he always dreamed of having.

Skate Video parts

As You Wish - Converse Cons - 2022
Louie, Again & Again - FA World Entertainment - 2022
Honor Roll - Spitfire - 2022
Days of Grace - FA World Entertainment - 2021
Worldly Goods - Volcom Skate - 2021
Lola - Converse Cons - 2020 
The Louie Lopez II - FA World Entertainment - 2020 
Seize the Seconds - Converse Cons - 2020 
The Louie Lopez - FA World Entertainment - 2020
GODSPEED - Illegal Civ - 2020
Keep the Fire Burning - Spitfire - 2019
Purple - Converse - 2018
West End - Volcom - 2017
Spitfire - Spitfire - 2017
RV Rampage - Volcom - 2017
One Star World Tour  - Converse - 2016
Holy Smokes - Volcom - 2016
True to this - Volcom - 2016
Goosenectar - Independent - 2014
Flip 3 - Flip - 2014
Illegal Civilization 2 - Illegal Civ - 2014
 Weight of the World - Flip - 2012
 Extremely Sorry - Flip - 2009
 United By Fate - Globe - 2007

Sponsors 
Louie Lopez's sponsors include: Converse, FA, Volcom, Independent Trucks, Spitfire Wheels, Hardies Hardware, and Miles Griptape.

References 

1994 births
Living people
American skateboarders
American sportspeople of Mexican descent